Patricia Gets Her Man is a 1937 British romantic comedy film directed by Reginald Purdell and starring Hans Söhnker, Lesley Brook and Edwin Styles. The screenplay concerns a woman who attempts to attract a film star.

It was made at Teddington Studios as a quota quickie by Warner Brothers.

Plot summary
In an effort to attract a film star a woman pays another man to pretend to be a suitor in order to provoke jealously in the star. However, she soon begins to fall in love with her hired partner.

Cast
 Hans Söhnker as Count Stephan d'Orlet
 Lesley Brook as Patricia Fitzroy
 Edwin Styles as Brian Maxwell
 Aubrey Mallalieu as Colonel Fitzroy
 Cissy Fitzgerald as Duchess Banning
 Betty Lynne as Marie
 Yoshihide Yanai as Suki

References

Bibliography
 Chibnall, Steve. Quota Quickies: The British of the British 'B' Film. British Film Institute, 2007.
 Low, Rachael. Filmmaking in 1930s Britain. George Allen & Unwin, 1985.
 Wood, Linda. British Films, 1927-1939. British Film Institute, 1986.

External links

1937 films
1937 romantic comedy films
British romantic comedy films
Films shot at Teddington Studios
Warner Bros. films
Quota quickies
British black-and-white films
1930s English-language films
1930s British films